Sean Fletcher (born 20 April 1974) is an American-English journalist, rapper, and television presenter best known as a presenter on Good Morning Britain and on Countryfile.

Fletcher has also presented the ITV daytime game show Rebound (2015–2016) and the BBC Sunday morning talk show Sunday Morning Live (2017–present).

Early life and education
Born in New York City to a Zimbabwean-born mother and English father, he was brought up in Essex and in Zimbabwe.

Fletcher was educated at Felsted School, an independent school in the village of Felsted (near Great Dunmow) in Essex, followed by King's College London, where he obtained a degree in Geography.

Career
After training as a music producer, Fletcher began his journalism career in Cardiff, producing packages for BBC Radio Wales. He then moved to London to work behind the scenes at Radio 5 Live. Several years later he began working on BBC 2W, the digital TV channel for Wales. He also presented and reported on sport for BBC Wales Today.

From 2005 until 2011, Fletcher presented sports bulletins on the rolling news channel BBC News, and has also presented sport on the BBC Weekend News and BBC Breakfast on BBC One as well as BBC World News. In March 2010, Fletcher began reporting on news stories for BBC Breakfast.

In October 2011, Fletcher left the BBC to join Sky Sports News, where he worked until his departure in early 2014.

On 3 March 2014, it was announced Fletcher would become a sports newsreader on the new ITV Breakfast programme Good Morning Britain. He first appeared on the programme on its opening day, 28 April 2014.

In 2015, Fletcher presented Rebound, a ten-part daytime game show for ITV, airing in the 5 pm slot. A second series of the show was produced and aired in 2016. In September 2015, he appeared in an episode of All Star Mr & Mrs alongside his wife Luned.

Since October 2015, Fletcher has been an occasional reporter for Countryfile on BBC One.

Fletcher co-presented the BBC Two series Food Detectives alongside Tom Kerridge and Alice Roberts in 2016. Since 2017, he has presented the Sunday morning BBC One programme Sunday Morning Live alongside Emma Barnett. He has also been an occasional co-presenter of the BBC One Sunday programme Songs of Praise.

In September 2017, Fletcher replaced Matthew Wright as presenter of BBC's current affairs programme Inside Out London. In October 2017, he co-presented Britain's Classroom Heroes with Naga Munchetty on BBC Two.

Personal life
Fletcher speaks Welsh fluently, and is married to Luned Tonderai, a Welsh television producer and director. The couple have two children. He is a Christian. He supports Tottenham Hotspur F.C.

Charity
In 2014, Fletcher became a celebrity ambassador for the UK charity, Balls to Cancer. In September 2015, Sean became an ambassador for the Beating Bowel Cancer charity. He ran the 2015 and 2016 London Marathon to raise money for the charity. In 2017, Fletcher ran the London Marathon for Heads Together and Young Minds UK.

In 2016, he played for the 'Rest of the World' team on ITV's celebrity football match Soccer Aid, which supports UNICEF UK.

Filmography

References

External links

Official website

1974 births
Living people
Welsh-language television presenters
People educated at Felsted School
Alumni of King's College London
American emigrants to England
American people of English descent
American people of Zimbabwean descent
BBC newsreaders and journalists
BBC World News
Black British television personalities
English sports journalists
ITV Breakfast presenters and reporters
People from Essex
Journalists from New York City
Sky Sports presenters and reporters
English Christians